The 1955 Detroit Lions season was their 26th in the league. The team failed to improve on their previous season's output of 9–2–1, winning only three games. They missed the playoffs for the first time in four seasons.

Schedule

Note: Intra-conference opponents are in bold text.
 Saturday night (October 1, November 5), Thursday (November 24: Thanksgiving)

Standings

Roster

References

External links
1955 Detroit Lions at Pro Football Reference
1955 Detroit Lions at jt-sw.com
1955 Detroit Lions at the Football Database (FootballDB.com)

Detroit Lions seasons
Detroit Lions
Detroit Lions